Katie Dey is an Australian experimental pop musician.

Career
Dey released her first album, Asdfasdf, in 2015 with the label Orchid Tapes. Dey attracted the attention of Orchid Tapes founder Warren Hildebrand after Mat Cothran of Elvis Depressedly discovered Dey's blog. Pitchfork rated the album with a 7 out of 10. In 2016, Dey released her second full-length album, Flood Network, this time with the label Joy Void. Pitchfork gave the album a 7.8 out of 10 rating. In 2018, Dey collaborated on an album with musician Devi McCallion of Black Dresses, titled Some New Form of Life. In May 2019, Dey surprise released her third full-length album titled Solipsisters, on Run for Cover Records. Pitchfork rated the album a 7.9 out of 10.

In July 2020, Dey released her fourth full-length album titled Mydata, which received a 7.5 out of 10 from Pitchfork and was chosen as Album of the Week by Stereogum. Dey then released a sequel collaboration album to Some New Form of Life with Devi McCallion in September 2020 titled Magic Fire Brain. The album was also selected by Stereogum as Album of the Week upon its release. In January 2021, Dey released a Mydata remix album titled Urdata with collaborators including Laura Les, June Jones, Devi McCallion, and Ada Rook.

Artistry 
Dey's music has been characterized as "digitally warped" and has been noted especially for her use of "distinctive vocal effects" as well as by her "resourceful use of pitch-shifting and bizarre instrumental choices, for which she has been compared to indie rock/bedroom pop artist Alex G. Despite her use of glitchy digital effects and Synthesizers, she has been characterized as a singer-songwriter: Stereogum writer James Rettig writes about Mydata, “Take away the digitally fucked sonics and [her songs are] downright universal. She basically makes hyper-modern piano ballads, rooted in old songwriting traditions — a girl and a piano, trying to bang out some existential crisis." 

Dey has related some of these stylistic choices to her status as a trans woman. In an interview with The Fader, she said pitch-shifting her vocals was originally "a way of relieving dysphoria and making my own music more palatable for me to listen to so that it didn't upset me". Her collaboration album Some New Form of Life marked the first time she released music with "totally unaffected" vocals, which she attributes to confidence resulting from her friendship with fellow trans woman Devi McCallion. Her album Solipsisters is written as an exploration of the relation between the soul and body and as a way of working through her personal conflicts in this area.

Dey is especially interested in exploring online relationships and online communities in her music. She explains in an interview that many of her friendships have come from the internet via her music, including her friendship with Toronto-based musician Devi McCallion. Dey's album Mydata is written, according to her, "explicitly about an internet relationship, which can be precisely as meaningful as a relationship that’s physical". The album features a music video for the lead single "dancing" filmed in the online virtual world Second Life which depicts a long-distance online relationship.

Discography
Studio albums
Asdfasdf (Orchid Tapes, 2015)
Flood Network (2016, Joy Void)
Solipsisters (2019, Run for Cover)
Mydata (2020, Run for Cover)
Forever Music (2022, self-released)

Remix albums
Urdata (2021, Run for Cover)

Collaborations
Katie Dey/Devi McCallion – Some New Form of Life (2018, self-released)
Katie Dey/Devi McCallion – Magic Fire Brain (2020, self-released)

References

Living people
Australian experimental musicians
Year of birth missing (living people)
Australian LGBT musicians
Transgender women musicians
Run for Cover Records artists
Australian women in electronic music
Australian LGBT singers

Transgender singers